The Democratic Left Front was formed as a non-sectarian and non-authoritarian anti-capitalist front in South Africa. It was formed from the Conference for a Democratic Left launched in 2008, at an event held in Johannesburg in January 2011. It played a role in solidarity campaigns, most notably concerning the Marikana massacre. With the rise of the United Front, and following divisions within the DLF, the formation disappeared.

Debates

The South African Unemployed Peoples' Movement welcomed the DLF as an "historic opportunity". The Zabalaza Anarchist Communist Front expressed reservations about the entirely middle class nature of the leadership of the DLF and internal democracy/ The leadership of the DLF included notable figures pushed out of the South African Communist Party, like Mazibuko Jara, and the party therefore kept its distance, and has, for several years, proposed instead a "left popular front."

Campaigns

The DLF engaged in several public campaigns. These included strong support for the rights of LGTBI people against violence. The DLF was actively involved in the Occupy Johannesburg movement in coordination with Taking Back South Africa! on 15 October 2011 as part of the global Occupy movement. The DLF supported the Marikana miners' strike in 2012 and was centrally involved in the Marikana Support Committee.

Further reading
Is the SACP Still Relevant?, Mazibuko K. Jara, The Times, July 2011
 Reclaiming the South African dream, Vishwas Satgar, Red Pepper, December 2011
 Comments on the Democratic Left Front, Mail & Guardian, February 2012
 Mazibuko Jara: Advocate of the New Left, Reconciliation Barometer, February 2013
 Left wing dips into ocean of irrelevance, Imraan Buccus, Mail & Guardian, May 2014

See also
 Socialism
 Trotskyism
 Eco-Socialism

External links
 Official website

Notes and references

2008 establishments in South Africa
Democratic socialism in Africa
Organizations established in 2008
Civic and political organisations based in Johannesburg
Political organisations based in South Africa
Socialism in South Africa
Socialist organizations